Sod, also known as turf, is the upper layer of soil with the grass growing on it that is often harvested into rolls.

In British and Australian English, sod is more commonly known as turf, and the word "sod" is limited mainly to agricultural senses.

Uses 
Sod is generally used for lawns, golf courses, and sports stadiums around the world. In residential construction, it is sold to landscapers, home builders or home owners who use it to establish a lawn quickly and avoid soil erosion. Sod can be used to repair a small area of lawn, golf course, or athletic field that has died and is used as a quicker alternative to re-growing a lawn from seed. Sod is also effective in increasing cooling, improving air and water quality, and assisting in flood prevention by draining water.

Scandinavia has a long history of employing sod roofing and a traditional house type is the Icelandic turf house.

Following the passage of the Homestead Act by Congress in 1862, settlers in the Great Plains used sod bricks to build entire sod houses. This was effective because the prairie sod of the Great Plains was so dense and difficult to cut it earned the nickname "Nebraska marble". Blacksmith John Deere made his fortune when he became the first to make a plow that could reliably cut the prairie sod.

Different types of grass are used for sod installation.

Cultivation 

Sod is grown on specialist farms. For 2009, the United States Department of Agriculture reported 1,412 farms had  of sod in production.

It is usually grown locally (within 100 miles of the target market) to minimize both the cost of transport and also the risk of damage to the product. The farms that produce this grass may have many varieties of grass grown in one location to best suit the consumer's use and preference of appearance.

It is usually harvested 10 to 18 months after planting, depending on the growing climate. On the farm, it undergoes fertilization, frequent mowing, watering, and subsequent vacuuming to remove the clippings. It is harvested using specialized equipment, precision cut to standardized sizes. Sod is typically harvested in small square or rectangular slabs, or large  rolls.

The Mississippi State University has developed a hydroponic method of cultivating sod. For the very few sod farms that export turf internationally, this soilless sod may travel both lighter and better than traditional sod. Additionally, since the sod is not grown in soil, it does not need to be washed clean of soil down to the bare roots (or sprigs), so time to export is shortened.

Immediacy 

In many applications, such as erosion control and athletic fields, immediacy is a key factor. Seed may be blown about by the wind, eaten by birds, or fail because of drought.  It takes some weeks to form a visually appealing lawn and further time before it is robust enough for use. Sod largely avoids these problems, and with proper care, newly laid sod is usually fully functional within 30 days of installation and its root system is comparable to that of a seeding lawn two to three years older. Sod also reduces erosion by stabilizing the soil.

Many prized cultivars (such as Bella Bluegrass, a brand-named dwarf variant of Kentucky Bluegrass) can only be reproduced vegetatively rather than sexually (via seed). For these, sod cultivation is the only means of producing additional plants. To grow these varieties for sale, turf farms use a technique called sprigging, where recently harvested sod mats are cut into slender rows and replanted in the field.

Cultivars used

Fescue grass

Tall fescue 
Tall fescue (Festuca spp.) is a cool-weather group of grasses originating in Europe, commonly used as sod. It is moderately tolerant to both drought and cold, and as such is especially popular in inland temperate environments referred to in the turf and landscaping industries as the "transition zone", where summers are too hot for most cool-weather grasses, yet winters are too cold for most warm-weather grasses. Fescue is well-adapted to clay soils, moderately shade-tolerant, and somewhat resistant to disease, yet vulnerable to the diseases brown patch and Fusarium patch. It grows most actively (and thus provides the most desirable appearance) in spring and fall, and requires frequent watering during summer. Due to its bunch-type growth habit (unique among common sod grasses), it will not spread undesirably or invade adjacent areas once sodded, yet neither will it fill in voids, and periodic maintenance (such as overseeding with Fescue seed) may be required to sustain a homogeneous surface. It has poor wear tolerance compared to Bermuda grass, making it less popular for applications such as athletic fields.

Fine fescues 
Fine fescues (F. rubra, F. ovina, F. trichophylla) are less popular as sod than the tall fescues. As their names suggest, they exhibit much thinner leaf blades, and tolerate lower mowing heights than the tall fescues. They may be somewhat more resistant to common diseases. Otherwise, their characteristics are similar. Fine fescues are generally used in mixtures with other grasses.

Bermuda grass 
Bermuda grass is quite commonly used for golf courses and sports fields across the southern portions of the United States. It tolerates a range of climates in the U.S., from hot and humid lagoons, inlets, and bays of the Gulf Coast, to the arid expanses of terrain like plains and deserts in the Southwest and parts of the Lower Midwest. Established bermuda grass is a network of shoots, rhizomes, stolons, and crown tissue together that usually form a dense plant canopy. This dense plant canopy can be used to propagate clonal varieties by sod, sprigs, or plugs. The aggressive and resilient nature of Bermuda grass makes it not only an excellent turfgrass but also a challenging and invasive weed in land cultivated for other purposes. Its one noted weakness is its relatively low tolerance of shade. Given the economic importance of Bermuda grass (as a sod product, agricultural forage, and, at times, as an invasive weed), it has been the subject of numerous studies.

Celebration Bermuda grass:
Celebration Bermuda grass is a dark–green, fine–textured, aggressive, traffic–tolerant cultivar with high recuperative potential and drought tolerance."  The cultivar is a breed of Cynodon dactylon from Australia developed by turfgrass breeder Rod Riley. The grass has a distinctive deep blue–green color which makes it popular on golf courses and for private home lawns throughout the southern United States. As a leading cultivar, the research on the grass is extensive. The grass was rated for the best shade tolerance by the United States Golf Association. A researcher at the University of Florida noted this cultivar's, "good wear tolerance, quality, and color ratings" in the Central Florida environment. The grass was the overall best–performing turfgrass in a 2–year drought resistance study commissioned by the San Antonio Water System and performed by Texas A & M extension service. The cultivar was also the top–rated Bermuda grass for drought resistance in a test conducted in South Carolina. Along with many golf courses across the southern United States, the Tampa Bay Buccaneers elected to install Celebration Bermudagrass in their stadium.

Discovery Bermuda grass:
Discovery is a Bermuda grass that has an exceptional dark blue-green color. It also has extremely slow vertical growth which means that it only needs to be mowed once a month. Discovery has the drought resistance of a Bermuda grass but does not need to be maintained as much as other varieties. It was developed in Europe. It was made available in the United States in 2011 by Sod Solutions which owns the right to market it in the United States.  It grows well in all of the southern United States.

Bluegrass
 
Bella Bluegrass:
Bella Bluegrass was developed by the University of Nebraska as a drought–resistant grass that would help states conserve water. It was immediately embraced by schools and homeowners in Utah who are trying to conserve water. Bella is the world's first dwarf, vegetative bluegrass. It is sold only as sod, not as seed. Bella is a quick grower laterally but has very minimal vertical growth. Because it only grows to about 4 inches in height, it requires less mowing.  It grows in sand, clay, muck, and peat soils, and it is currently being adopted across the northern United States.

St. Augustine grass 
St. Augustine grass (Stenotaphrum secundatum) (also known as Charleston grass in South Carolina and Buffalo Turf in Australia) is warm-season, perennial grass that is a widely used. A native grass of tropical origin that extends from marshes (salt and freshwater), lagoon fringes, and sandy beach ridges.

St. Augustine lawns are a popular coarse, wide–bladed coarse lawn planted throughout many areas of the Southeastern United States This grass is found in Mexico, Australia, and in tropical parts of Africa. It is a warm-season grass that does not handle cold weather very well. The majority of this grass is planted in vegetative forms (such as plugs and sod), as seeds are not usually available due to production difficulties.

Captiva St. Augustine:
Developed by the University of Florida in 2007, Captiva is a chinch bug resistant St. Augustine cultivar.  It has a lush, dark-green color with a dense canopy and a massive root system.  Because it has a slow leaf-blade growth and lateral spread, the requirement for mowing is reduced. Captiva has a good–excellent shade tolerance and has excellent pest resistance which means there is less need to use pesticides.

Centipedegrass 
Covington:
Centipedegrass was introduced into the United States from southeastern Asia in 1916. It does well in the climate and soils of central and northern Florida and is the most common home lawn grass in the Florida Panhandle. Covington is a proprietary cultivar of centipede grass from Sod Solutions that grows in the southeast United States, from the west half of Texas to all of Louisiana, most of Mississippi, Alabama, Georgia, South Carolina, North Carolina, and Virginia. It is the only uniformly green centipede grass on the market. It is a low-maintenance grass, which retains its color in the fall and greens quickly in the spring. This variety is currently being evaluated by the University of Florida.
Santee:
Santee grass is another new proprietary selection from Sod Solutions, which is also being evaluated by the University of Florida for adaptation to Florida use.:

Wildflower turf 
Wildflower turf is a type of lawn alternative that is made up of a mixture of wildflower seeds. These seeds are sown together and grow to form a lush carpet of colourful flowers, rather than the traditional monoculture of grass found in a traditional lawn. Wildflower turf can be a low-maintenance and sustainable alternative to traditional lawns, as well as providing a habitat for beneficial insects and other wildlife. They often require less watering and fertilization than traditional lawns and can be a great way to add visual interest to your landscape. Wildflower turf can be used in the restoration of natural habitats, such as meadows, prairies, and wetlands. It is used on green roofs to provide a natural-looking and low-maintenance alternative to traditional green roof systems. Wildflower turf can help to sequester carbon from the atmosphere, helping to mitigate the effects of climate change and to purify the air by absorbing pollutants and releasing oxygen.

Natural turf communities 
A form of turf community is a herbfield.

See also 

 Cob (building)
 Divot
 Groundbreaking
 Peat

References

External links 
How to lay turf

Lawn care
Landscape architecture
Soil-based building materials